The Apple, the Stem and the Seeds is a Canadian sex comedy film, directed by Claude Fournier and released in 1970. The film stars Donald Lautrec as Martial Roy, a former playboy who suddenly finds himself dealing with erectile dysfunction after falling in love with and marrying Louise Letarte (Han Masson), leading them both on a journey of trying out various cures and solutions.

The cast also includes Roméo Pérusse, Janine Sutto, Réal Béland, Thérèse Morange, Jean Lapointe, Danielle Ouimet, Louise Turcot and Denis Drouin.

References

External links

1974 films
1974 comedy films
Canadian sex comedy films
Films directed by Claude Fournier
Films shot in Quebec
Films set in Quebec
French-language Canadian films
1970s Canadian films